Frank Duffy (27 August 1959 – 16 December 2010) was a Scottish wheelchair curler. He was the skip of the silver medal-winning British team at the 2006 Winter Paralympics. He began curling at age 12 and developed paraplegia due to an accident at 35. His career highlights include sharing Gold at the 2004 and 2005 WCF World Championships. Duffy was found dead in his burnt out motor on 16 December 2010, in an apparent suicide.

Results

References

External links

1959 births
2010 deaths
Medalists at the 2006 Winter Paralympics
Paralympic silver medalists for Great Britain
Paralympic wheelchair curlers of Great Britain
Scottish male curlers
Scottish wheelchair curlers
Scottish Paralympic competitors
Wheelchair curlers at the 2006 Winter Paralympics
World wheelchair curling champions
Paralympic medalists in wheelchair curling